The Jameh Mosque of Kabir Neyriz is related to the Seljuq dynasty and is located in the Neyriz.

References

Mosques in Iran
Mosque buildings with domes
National works of Iran